Plaudren is a commune in the Morbihan department and Brittany region of north-western France. In French the inhabitants of Plaudren are known as Plaudrinois.

Geography
The river Arz has its source in the commune.

See also
Communes of the Morbihan department

References

External links

 Mayors of Morbihan Association 

Communes of Morbihan